ADRenalin, the young ADR is the youth wing of the Alternative Democratic Reform Party (ADR), a conservative political party in Luxembourg.

Founded under the original name ADR Youth in 1999, the organization on 23 December 2008 adopted its current name. Its members are aged between 18 & 35.

Presidents
 Christian Schaack (1999-2005)
 Tania Gibéryen (2006-2007)
 Joëlle Giannotte (2008–2009)
 Andy Maar (2010–2011)
 Joëlle Giannotte (2012–2013)
 Joe Thein (2015-2016)
 Joëlle Giannotte (2016–2017)
 Michel Lemaire (2017-

See also

References

External links

Youth wings of political parties in Luxembourg
Youth wings of conservative parties
Youth wings of Alliance of Conservatives and Reformists in Europe member parties
1999 establishments in Luxembourg
Organizations established in 1999